Overlee may refer to:

 Overlee Playing Fields, a park in Stamperland, Clarkston, East Renfrewshire
 Highland Park–Overlee Knolls, a historic district in Maryland

See also
 Overlea, Maryland